The Heidelberg School was an Australian art movement of the late 19th century. It has been described as Australian impressionism.

Melbourne art critic Sidney Dickinson coined the term in an 1891 review of works by Arthur Streeton and Walter Withers, two local artists who painted en plein air in Heidelberg on the city's rural outskirts. The term has since evolved to cover painters who worked together at "artists' camps" around Melbourne and Sydney in the 1880s and 1890s. Along with Streeton and Withers, Tom Roberts, Charles Conder and Frederick McCubbin are considered key figures of the movement. Drawing on naturalist and impressionist ideas, they sought to capture Australian life, the bush, and the harsh sunlight that typifies the country.

The movement emerged at a time of strong nationalist sentiment in Australia, then a group of colonies on the cusp of federating. The artists' paintings, not unlike the bush poems of the Bulletin School, were celebrated for being distinctly Australian in character, and by the early 20th century, critics had come to identify the movement as the beginning of an Australian tradition in Western art. Many of their most recognisable works can be seen in Australia's major public galleries, including the National Gallery of Australia, the National Gallery of Victoria and the Art Gallery of New South Wales.

History
The name refers to the then rural area of Heidelberg, east of Melbourne, where practitioners of the style found their subject matter, though usage expanded to cover other Australian artists working in similar areas. The core group painted together at "artists' camps", the first being the Box Hill artists' camp, established in 1885. Besides Arthur Streeton and Walter Withers, other major artists in the movement included Tom Roberts, Frederick McCubbin and Charles Conder. See below for a list of other associated artists.

9 by 5 Impression Exhibition

In August 1889, several artists of the Heidelberg School staged the 9 by 5 Impression Exhibition at Buxton's Rooms, Swanston Street, opposite the Melbourne Town Hall. The exhibition's three principal artists were Charles Conder, Tom Roberts and Arthur Streeton, with minor contributions from Frederick McCubbin, National Gallery students R. E. Falls and Herbert Daly, and sculptor Charles Douglas Richardson, who exhibited five sculpted impressions. Most of the 183 works included in the exhibition were painted on wooden cigar-box lids, measuring 9 by 5 inches (23 × 13 cm), hence the name of the exhibition. Louis Abrahams, a member of the Box Hill artists' camp, sourced most of the lids from his family's tobacconist shop. In order to emphasise the small size of the paintings, the artists displayed them in broad Red Gum frames, some left unornamented, others decorated with verse and small sketches, giving the works an "unconventional, avant garde look". The Japonist décor of Buxton's Rooms featured Japanese screens, umbrellas, and vases with flowers that perfumed the gallery, while the influence of Whistler's Aestheticism also shone through in the harmony and "total effect" of the display.

The artists wrote in the catalogue:

The exhibition caused a stir with many members of Melbourne's 'intelligentsia' attending during its three-week run. The general public, though somewhat bemused, responded positively, and within two weeks of the opening, most of the 9 by 5s had sold. The response from critics, however, was mixed. The most scathing review came from James Smith, then Australia's foremost art critic, who said the 9 by 5s were "destitute of all sense of the beautiful" and "whatever influence [the exhibition] was likely to exercise could scarcely be otherwise than misleading and pernicious." The artists pasted the review to the entrance of the venue—attracting many more passing pedestrians to, in Streeton's words, "see the dreadful paintings"—and responded with a letter to the Editor of Smith's newspaper, The Argus. Described as a manifesto, the letter defends freedom of choice in subject and technique, concluding:

 

The 9 by 5 Impression Exhibition is now regarded as a landmark event in Australian art history. Approximately one-third of the 9 by 5s are known to have survived, many of which are held in Australia's public collections, and have sold at auction for prices exceeding $1,000,000.

Grosvenor Chambers

Built "expressly for occupation by artists" by the art decorating firm Paterson Bros. (established by Hugh and James Paterson, brothers of plein airist and associate of the Heidelberg School John Ford Paterson), Grosvenor Chambers opened at the eastern end of Collins Street in April 1888 and quickly became the focal point of Melbourne's art scene, as well as an urban base from which members of the Heidelberg School could receive sitters for portraits. The architects arranged the lighting and interior design of the building after consulting Roberts, who, along with Heidelberg School members Jane Sutherland and Clara Southern, was among the first artists to occupy studios in the building. They were soon followed by Conder, Streeton, McCubbin, Louis Abrahams and John Mather, among others.

Many of the artists decorated their studios in an Aesthetic manner, showing the influence of James Abbott McNeill Whistler. Roberts' use of eucalypts and golden wattle as decorations started a fad for Australian flora in the home. He also initiated in-studio conversaziones at which artists discussed recent artistic trends and read the latest art journals.

The presence of Roberts, Streeton and Conder at Grosvenor Chambers accounts for the high number of urban views they included in the 9 by 5 Impression Exhibition, including Roberts' By the Treasury, painted from the vantage point of his studio and featuring the Old Treasury Building on Spring Street.

Sydney

Roberts first visited Sydney in 1887. There, he developed a strong artistic friendship with Charles Conder, a young painter who had already gone on plein air excursions outside Sydney and picked up some impressionist techniques from expatriate artist G. P. Nerli. In early 1888, before Conder joined Roberts on his return trip to Melbourne, the pair painted companion works at the beachside suburb of Coogee.

When a severe economic depression hit Melbourne in 1890, Roberts and Streeton moved to Sydney, first setting up camp at Mosman Bay, a small cove of the harbour, before finally settling around the corner at Curlew Camp, which was accessible by the Mosman ferry. Melbourne artist Albert Henry Fullwood stayed with Streeton at Curlew, as well as other plen air painters on occasion, including prominent art teacher and Heidelberg School supporter Julian Ashton, who resided nearby at the Balmoral artists' camp. Ashton had earlier introduced Conder to plein air painting, and in 1890, as a trustee of the National Gallery of New South Wales in Sydney, secured the acquisition of Streeton's Heidelberg landscape ‘Still glides the stream, and shall forever glide’ (1890)—the first of the artist's works to enter a public collection. The more sympathetic patronage shown by Ashton and others in Sydney inspired more artists to make the move from Melbourne.

Streeton won acclaim in Sydney for his harbour views, many of which were collected by Eadith Walker and Howard Hinton, two of the city's leading art patrons. In a poem dedicated to the artist, composer and outspoken sensualist George Marshall-Hall declared Streeton's Sydney the "City of laughing loveliness! Sun-girdled Queen!", which became the title of one of his harbour views. The National Gallery of Victoria notes:

From Sydney, Streeton and Roberts branched out into country New South Wales, where, in the early 1890s, they painted some of their most celebrated works.

Influences and style

Like many of their contemporaries in Europe and North America, members of the Heidelberg School adopted a direct and impressionistic style of painting. They regularly painted landscapes en plein air, and sought to depict daily life. They showed a keen interest in the effects of lighting, and experimented with a variety of brushstroke techniques. A number of art critics, including Robert Hughes, have noted that the "impressionism" of the Heidelberg School had more in common with Whistler's tonal impressionism than the broken colours of the French impressionists. Indeed, the Heidelberg School artists did not espouse any colour theory, and, unlike the more radical approach of the French artists, often maintained some degree of academic emphasis on form, clarity and composition. They also sometimes created works within the narrative conventions of Victorian painting. The Australians had little direct contact with the French impressionists; for example, it was not until 1907 that McCubbin saw their works in person, which encouraged his evolution towards a looser, more abstracted style.

The Heidelberg School painters were not merely following an international trend, but "were interested in making paintings that looked distinctly Australian". They greatly admired the light-infused landscapes of Louis Buvelot, a Swiss-born artist and art teacher who, in the 1860s, adapted French Barbizon School principles to the countryside around Melbourne. Regarding Buvelot as "the father of Australian landscape painting", they showed little interest in the works of earlier colonial artists, opining that they looked more like European scenes that did not reflect Australia's harsh sunlight, earthier colours and distinctive vegetation. The Heidelberg School painters spoke of seeing Australia "through Australian eyes", and by 1889, Roberts argued that they had successfully developed "a distinct and vital and creditable style". The notion that they were the first to objectively capture Australia's "scrubby bush" gained widespread acceptance in the early 20th century, but has since been disputed; for example, art historian Bernard Smith identified "an authentic bush atmosphere" in John Lewin's landscapes of the 1810s,<ref>Smith, Bernard (1962). Australian Painting: 1788-1960. Oxford University Press, p. 19.</ref> and John Glover in the 1830s is seen to have faithfully rendered Australia's unique light and sprawling, untidy gum trees.

Associated artists

There was no official membership of the Heidelberg School, but artists are said to be part of the movement based on their adoption of plein airism and impressionist techniques, as well as their attendance at the Melbourne and Sydney "artists' camps". Heidelberg School artists also often trained together at the National Gallery of Victoria Art School, and staged group exhibitions at the Victorian Artists' Society. Art historians have included the following people in the movement:

Louis Abrahams
Julian Ashton
Charles Conder
David Davies
Emanuel Phillips Fox
Ethel Carrick Fox
Albert Henry Fullwood
Ina Gregory
Tom Humphrey
John Llewellyn Jones
John Mather
Frederick McCubbin
Leon Pole
Jane Price
Charles Douglas Richardson
Tom Roberts
Arthur Streeton
Clara Southern
Jane Sutherland
Tudor St. George Tucker
Walter Withers

Locations

Heidelberg
Beaumaris
Blackburn
Box Hill (see Box Hill artists' camp)
Bulleen
Templestowe
Warrandyte
Eltham
Research
Diamond Creek
Ferntree Gully
Kallista
Olinda
Mount Dandenong
Kalorama
Silvan
Lilydale
Yarra Glen
Coldstream
Yering
 Mentone
Sydney artists' camps

Legacy

Writing in 1980, Australian artist and scholar Ian Burn described the Heidelberg School as "mediating the relation to the bush of most people growing up in Australia. ... Perhaps no other local imagery is so much a part of an Australian consciousness and ideological make-up." Their works are known to many Australians through reproductions, appearing in bars and motels, on stamps and as the covers of paperback copies of colonial literature. Heidelberg School artworks are among the most collectible in Australian art; in 1995, the National Gallery of Australia acquired Streeton's Golden Summer, Eaglemont (1889) from a private owner for $3.5 million, then a record price for an Australian painting. McCubbin's Bush Idyll (1893) briefly held the record price for a publicly auctioned Australian painting when it sold at Christie's in 1998 for $2.31 million.

Many period films of the Australian New Wave drew upon the visual style and subject matter of the Heidelberg School. For Picnic at Hanging Rock (1975), director Peter Weir studied the Heidelberg School as a basis for art direction, lighting, and composition. Sunday Too Far Away (1975), set on an outback sheep station, pays homage to Roberts' shearing works, to the extent that Shearing the Rams is recreated within the film. When shooting the landscape in The Chant of Jimmie Blacksmith (1978), cinematographer Ian Baker tried to "make every shot a Tom Roberts". The Getting of Wisdom (1977) and My Brilliant Career (1979) each found inspiration in the Heidelberg School; outback scenes in the latter allude directly to works by Streeton, such as The Selector's Hut.

The Heidelberg School is examined in One Summer Again, a three-part docudrama that first aired on ABC television in 1985.

The movement featured in the Australian citizenship test, overseen by former prime minister John Howard in 2007. Such references to history were removed the following year, instead focusing on "the commitments in the pledge rather than being a general knowledge quiz about Australia."

The movement has been surveyed in major exhibitions, including the nationwide blockbuster Golden Summers: Heidelberg and Beyond (1986), and Australian Impressionism (2007), held at the National Gallery of Victoria. Inspired by their acquisition of Streeton's 1890 painting Blue Pacific, the National Gallery in London hosted an exhibition titled Australia's Impressionists between December 2016 and March 2017, focusing on works by Streeton, Roberts, Conder and John Russell, an Australian impressionist based in Europe. In 2021, from April to August, the National Gallery of Victoria will host the exhibition She-Oak and Sunlight: Australian Impressionism''.

Gallery

See also
John Russell, Australian impressionist who spent much of his career in France
Iso Rae, Australian impressionist who spent much of her career in France

General:
Visual arts of Australia
Impressionism

References

Further reading

External resources

In the Artist's Footsteps
Heidelberg School - The Encyclopedia of Melbourne Online
National Gallery of Victoria: Australian Impressionism Education Resource

 
Impressionism
Culture of Melbourne
Victorian era
Heidelberg, Victoria